Unifor Local 200 is a local union of the general trade union Unifor. It represents auto industry workers in Windsor, Ontario at three Ford Motor Company of Canada engine plants and one Nemak aluminum casting plant.

History

Presidents 

 Roy England
 Jack Taylor
 Charlie McDonald
 Vic White
 Herb Kelly
 Hank Renaud
 Steve Harris
 Ray Wakeman
 Frank McAnally
 Alex Keeney
 Mike Vince ( - January 1, 2010)
 Dan Cassady (January 2, 2010 - July 1 2011)
 Chris Taylor (July 1, 2011 - ?)
 John D'Agnolo ( ? - present)

Collective Bargaining Gains 

 1940s - Paid Vacation, Union Security (Rand Formula), Paid Holidays, COLA (Cost of Living Allowance), Job Postings, Grievance Procedure, Foreman Working Language, Overtime Premiums, Seniority for Vets.
 1950s - AIF (Annual Improvement Factor), Pensions, Insurance Plan (Medical-Hospital-Surgical), Supplemental Unemployment Benefits (SUB).
 1960s
 1970s - Optical & Dental, Health & Safety Committees, Hearing Aids, Pension - 30 and Out, Paid Personal Holidays, Paid Education Leave (PEL),
 1980s - Video Display Terminal Protection, Paid Maternity Leave, Childcare, Legal Services Plan, Income Maintenance (Beyond SUB), Union Counsellors, Affirmative Action, Health & Safety Company Wide Co-ordinators, Weekend Worker, Pension Indexation (for future retirees)
 1990s - Social Justice Fund, Four Day Weekends, Phased Retirement, Same Sex Benefits, Employment Equity Representatives - Women's Advocate, SPA Week, Harassment: Right to Refuse Training, Outsourcing Protection: Work Ownership, Protection from changes to Labour Laws, Union Training Funds, Pension Indexing (All Retirees), Skilled Trades Union Education Fund, Tuition Scholarship, Child Care Subsidy, Retirees Education Fund, Additional SPA Week, Environmental Representation.
 21st Century - Paramedical Coverage, Indefinite Layoff Protection (Special SUB), Homemaking Service and In Home Nursing, New Investment Commitment.

Struggles 
 Ford Strike of 1945

Local 200 & the Community 
 United Way/Centraide of Windsor-Essex County 
 Club 200 Youth Activities
 CAW Local 200 Computers for Kids
 Kelly England Bursary

References 

 Baruth-Walsh, Mary E. and Mark Walsh. Strike 99 Days on the Line. Canada: Penumbra Press, 1995.  (hardcover), 
 Colling, Herb. The Ford Strike in Windsor: 99 Days. Toronto: NC Press, 1995. 
 Colling, Herb. “Ford Strike of ‘45” in Best of Times Magazine, ed., Elaine Weeks. Windsor: Walkerville Publishing Co., 2006.

External links 

1941 establishments in Ontario
Economy of Windsor, Ontario
Organizations based in Windsor, Ontario
Local 0200
Trade unions in Ontario